The 2023 K4 League is the third season of the K4 League as a semi-professional league and the fourth tier of South Korean football league system. The regular season is from 25 February to 11 November 2023. Goyang KH FC is the defending champions and was promoted together with Yangpyeong FC (the runner-up) and Chuncheon Citizen (play-off winner) to 2023 K3 League. Dangjin Citizen were relegated from 2022 K3 League via K3-K4 League Relegation play-off and will play in the K4 League after one season.

Competition format 
The 2022 K4 League is contested by 17 teams, with no relegation system in place. Each team competes home and away, playing 32 games. The top two teams get promoted to the K3 League, while the third and the fourth placed teams qualify for the promotion play-off.

Promotion and relegation
Teams relegated from the 2022 K3 League
 Dangjin Citizen (via Relegation play-off)

Teams promoted to the 2023 K3 League
 Yangpyeong
 Chuncheon Citizen (via Promotion play-off)

New teams from 2023 K4 League
 Busan I'Park Futures
 Goyang Happiness FC
 Sejong Vanesse FC
 FC Chungju (previously Chungju Citizen FC dissolved in 2022)

Teams

League table

Results

Promotion play-off
The match will be played on 5 November 2023. The 3rd and 4th placed team from the 2023 K4 League will play for a spot in the 2024 K3 League against the team placed 14th in the 2023 K3 League.

Promotion play-off

Promotion–relegation play-off

Winner

See also 
 2023 Korean FA Cup
 2023 K League 1
 2023 K League 2
 2023 K3 League

References 

K4 League seasons
2023 in South Korean football